Toniki (Ancient Greek: Τωνική) was an ancient proto-Somali market town on the coast of the southeastern Lower Shabelle province of Somalia.

Overview
Toniki is believed to have been situated in the vicinity of Makasi in the present-day Barawa District.  

It was one of a series of ancient commercial ports along the coast of Somalia, which were described in the 1st century CE Greco-Roman travelogue the Periplus of the Erythraean Sea, as well as in Ptolemy's Geographia. Nearby market towns included Essina and Sarapion to the immediate north.

See also
Miandi
Nikon

Notes

Ancient Somalia
Archaeological sites in Somalia
Lower Shabelle
Ancient Greek geography of East Africa